Lithoprocris postcaerulescens is a moth of the subfamily Arctiinae. It was described by Rothschild in 1913.

References

 Natural History Museum Lepidoptera generic names catalog

Lithosiini
Moths described in 1913